Khusen Magometovich Khalmurzaev (born 9 October 1993) is a Russian judoka. He is the 2017 European bronze medalist in the 90 kg division. He is the twin brother of judoka Khasan.

References

External links
 

1993 births
Russian male judoka
Living people
Universiade medalists in judo
Russian twins
Twin sportspeople
People from Nazran
Universiade silver medalists for Russia
Universiade bronze medalists for Russia
Judoka at the 2019 European Games
European Games medalists in judo
European Games gold medalists for Russia
European Games bronze medalists for Russia
Medalists at the 2015 Summer Universiade
21st-century Russian people